Bernd Karbacher (born 3 April 1968) is a German retired professional tennis player. His highest ATP singles ranking is world No. 22, which he reached on 17 April 1995. His career-high doubles ranking was world No. 163, achieved on 6 June 1994.

During his career, he won two singles titles, Cologne in 1992 and the Swedish Open in Båstad in 1994.

He twice reached the quarterfinals of a Grand Slam tournament. He did so in 1994 at the US Open after defeating Ivan Lendl and at the French Open in 1996 after a win against Goran Ivanišević. He also reached the semifinals of the 1993 Hamburg Masters and reached the finals of Indianapolis in 1995 after defeating Pete Sampras.

At the 1998 US Open, Karbacher, then ranked World No. 155, upset Australian Open champion and fourth seed Petr Korda in the first round in four sets.

He retired from professional tennis in 2000. Since 2007, he has been the president of the German players organization "Tennis Germany".

ATP career finals

Singles: 3 (2 titles, 1 runner-up)

Doubles: 1 (1 title)

ATP Challenger and ITF Futures Finals

Singles: 2 (1–1)

Doubles: 2 (1–1)

Performance timeline

Singles

References

External links
 
 
 

1968 births
Living people
German male tennis players
Hopman Cup competitors
Tennis players from Munich
West German male tennis players